West Flanders is the westernmost province of the Flemish Region, in Belgium. It is the only coastal Belgian province, facing the North Sea to the northwest. It has land borders with the Dutch province of Zeeland to the northeast, the Flemish province of East Flanders to the east, the Walloon province of Hainaut in the southeast and the French department of Nord to the west. Its capital is Bruges (Brugge). Other important cities are Kortrijk in the south and Ostend (Oostende) on the coast, Roeselare and Ypres (Ieper).
As of January 2019, West Flanders has a population of 1,195,796.

The North Sea coast of Belgium, an important tourism destination, lies in West Flanders. A tram line runs the length of the coast, from De Panne on the French border to Knokke-Heist on the Dutch border. West Flanders has two seaports, the Port of Zeebrugge and the Port of Ostend.

Geography
West Flanders consists of the North Sea coast, followed by a very flat polder landscape. Only in the south are some small hills, with the Kemmelberg being the highest point in the province. The Leie and IJzer are the main rivers. West Flanders is the only Belgian province that borders both France and The Netherlands; it is the only province not landlocked.

Economy
The Gross domestic product (GDP) of the province was 46.9 billion € in 2018. GDP per capita adjusted for purchasing power was 34,700 € or 115% of the EU27 average in the same year.

In the north of the province, most industry is concentrated in and around the cities of Bruges and Ostend. Both cities also have important seaports: the port of Bruges-Zeebrugge and the port of Ostend.

The south is known for its textile industry, with companies such as Beaulieu and Libeco-Lagae. The region around Kortrijk is called the "Dallas of Belgium" for its entrepreneurship.

Tourism
Tourism is also an important industry in West Flanders. Major touristic attractions include the Belgian coast, the historic center of Bruges, the Yser Tower in Diksmuide and Flanders Fields, the World War I battlefields around Ypres.

Language

The region has a very distinct dialect of Dutch called West Flemish. This distinctive dialect is a part of the strong sense of identity of the inhabitants of the region.

Sport
The city of Bruges has two clubs playing at the highest level of football in Belgium (Belgian First Division A), namely Club Brugge and Cercle Brugge.

Other cities with teams playing at the highest level are Kortrijk (KV Kortrijk), Ostend (KV Oostende) and Waregem (Zulte Waregem).

The teams Knack Randstad Roeselare and Prefaxis Menen play in the highest volleyball league. Knack Randstad Roeselare also plays in the CEV Champions League, the European Championsleague.

BC Oostende is a basketball team which plays in the major basketball league of Belgium.

List of governors

 1830–1831 : Felix de Muelenaere (Catholic Party)
 1832–1834 : Felix de Muelenaere (Catholic Party)
 1836–1849 : Felix de Muelenaere (Catholic Party)
 1849–1857 : Adolphe de Vrière (Liberal)
 1857–1877 : Benoît Vrambout (Liberal)
 1877–1878 : Léon Ruzette (Catholic Party)
 1878–1883 : Theodore Heyvaert (Liberal)
 1883–1884 : Guillaume De Brouwer (Liberal)
 1884–1901 : Léon Ruzette (Catholic Party)
 1901 : Jean-Baptiste de Bethune (Catholic Party)
 1901–1903  : Charles d'Ursel (Catholic Party)
 1903–1907 : Jean-Baptiste de Bethune (Catholic Party)
 1907–1912 : Albéric Ruzette (Catholic Party)
 1912–1933 : Léon Janssens de Bisthoven
 1933–1940 : Henri Baels (Catholic Party)
 1940–1944 : Michel Bulckaert
 1944–1979 : Pierre van Outryve d'Ydewalle (CVP)
 1979 : Leo Vanackere (CVP)
 1979–1997 : Olivier Vanneste (CVP)
 1997–2012 : Paul Breyne (CVP/CD&V)
 February 2012– : Carl Decaluwé (CD&V)

Subdivisions

Arrondissements
The Province of West Flanders is divided into 8 administrative arrondissements.

Judicial arrondissements
The Province of West Flanders is divided into 4 judicial arrondissements.

Municipalities

Municipalities that have city status have (city) after their names.

1. Alveringem
2. Anzegem
3. Ardooie
4. Avelgem
5. Beernem
6. Blankenberge (city)
7. Bredene
8. Bruges (city)
9. Damme (city)
10. De Haan
11. De Panne
12. Deerlijk
13. Dentergem
14. Diksmuide (city)
15. Gistel (city)
16. Harelbeke (city)
17. Heuvelland
18. Hooglede
19. Houthulst
20. Ichtegem
21. Ypres (Ieper) (city)
22. Ingelmunster
23. Izegem (city)
24. Jabbeke
25. Knokke-Heist
26. Koekelare
27. Koksijde
28. Kortemark
29. Kortrijk (city)
30. Kuurne
31. Langemark-Poelkapelle
32. Ledegem
33. Lendelede
34. Lichtervelde
35. Lo-Reninge (city)
36. Menen (city)
37. Mesen (city)
38. Meulebeke
39. Middelkerke
40. Moorslede
41. Nieuwpoort (city)
42. Ostend (city)
43. Oostkamp
44. Oostrozebeke
45. Oudenburg (city)
46. Pittem
47. Poperinge (city)
48. Roeselare (city)
49. Ruiselede
50. Spiere-Helkijn
51. Staden
52. Tielt (city)
53. Torhout (city)
54. Veurne (city)
55. Vleteren
56. Waregem (city)
57. Wervik (city)
58. Wevelgem
59. Wielsbeke
60. Wingene
61. Zedelgem
62. Zonnebeke
63. Zuienkerke
64. Zwevegem

References

External links

Official website of the Province of West Flanders

 
NUTS 2 statistical regions of the European Union
Provinces of Flanders